The 1998 Philippines men's national basketball team, nicknamed the "Philippine Centennial Team", competed in the 1998 Asian Games. The team consisted of professional players in the country that included national team veterans Allan Caidic and Alvin Patrimonio, both sharing the distinction of being the only PBA players to represent the country in four Asian Games basketball tournaments since 1986. The team nickname was a reference to the centennial celebration of the independence of the Philippines.

The national team participated in the Philippine Basketball Association Centennial Cup (where they placed last, where other team had two non-Filipinos in their lineups) and later played exhibition games against the China national basketball team and the PBA All-Star (non-national team members) Selection. The Nationals went on to win the 21st William Jones Cup International Basketball Tournament in Taiwan and then on a tough Midwest tour of the United States.

The national team’s main goal was to win the 1998 Asian Games basketball tournament and to reclaim Philippine basketball supremacy in Asia. The team started the tournament by winning four games in a row and finished with a 5-2 record losing to China and Korea, but they were able to capture the Bronze medal in the play-offs.

Overall, the national basketball achievements of 1998 include the William Jones Cup and the Asian Games bronze medal. This team was the third PBA-backed national team that followed the 1994 national team (finished fourth) and the 1990 national team (finished second – Silver Medal), and preceded the 2002 national team that finished fourth in the Asian Games.

Tournaments

1998 Philippine Basketball Association All-Star Games

1998 William Jones Cup

Halftime scores in parentheses
Regulation Scores in double parentheses
Record: 6-0

1998 PBA Centennial Cup

1998 Asian Games

Halftime scores in parentheses
Record: 5-2

Members

Head coach: Tim Cone (Alaska)
Assistant coach: Chot Reyes (Metropolitan Basketball Association)
Assistant coach: Aric del Rosario (MBA, UST)
Team Manager: Joaqui Trillo (Alaska)
Team Scout: Jeffrey Cariaso (Mobiline)

Milestones
Allan Caidic and Alvin Patrimonio both have the rare distinction of having participated in four straight Asian Games basketball tournaments since 1986. They donned the national team colors in the 1986, 1990, 1994 and 1998.
Caidic also became the only Filipino player to win the William Jones Cup twice, once as an amateur in 1985 and once as a professional in 1998
Jojo Lastimosa was also a member of the 1986 Philippine team that won the bronze medal in the 1986 Asian Games.
Johnny Abarrientos, Kenneth Duremdes and Marlou Aquino played on their second Asian Games tournament.
In 1998, the Philippines won its third William Jones Cup title – the first two on 1981 and 1985.

External links
Philippine basketball history

1998
Asian Games
Philippine